Benfatto is a surname. Notable people with the surname include:

Attilio Benfatto (1943–2017), Italian cyclist
Luigi Benfatto (1551–1611), Italian painter
Marco Benfatto (born 1988), Italian racing cyclist

Italian-language surnames